Lower Belgrave Street is a street in London's Belgravia district.

It runs north-west to south-east and begins as a continuation of Upper Belgrave Street where it meets Eaton Square. It crosses one through-street, Ebury Street, and ends in a t-junction facing Victoria station's west front at Buckingham Palace Road.

Among the notable buildings are a mid-19th-century (initial category, Grade II-listed) Plumbers Arms at no 14. Another is a small primary school.

Notable residents
Sir Francis Taylor Piggott (1852–1925), jurist and author, born at no 31
Inez Holden (1903–1974), writer and Bohemian social figure and journalist, lived until her death at no 47A
John Bingham, 7th Earl of Lucan and his estranged family lived at no 46.  He had his permanent home at Elizabeth Street instead when he on 7 November 1974, according to his wife he returned, causing her wounds and to flee to the local pub and gave police evidence he must have been the culprit of the bludgeoning to death of their children's nanny in her basement. He was presumed dead in 1999 for probate purposes and in 2016 absolutely after his immediate disappearance.
Hope Portocarrero, the Nicaraguan dictator's wife, lived at number 35.

References

Belgravia
Streets in the City of Westminster